The Auburn River Dam is a possible future reservoir located on the Auburn River near Mundubbera, Queensland. The site was recommended for a new dam site after a recent soil test declared the area's topography and clay based soil ideal for a large dammed reservoir. At present, no conclusive plans have been created and the dam has not been proposed by either the Queensland Government or Sunwater.

References

Proposed dams
Dams in Queensland